Granite County is a county located in the U.S. state of Montana. As of the 2020 census, the population was 3,309. Its county seat is Philipsburg. The county was founded in 1893, and was named for a mountain which contains the Granite Mountain silver mine.

Geography

Major highways

  Interstate 90
  U.S. Highway 10 (Former)
  U.S. Highway 12
  Montana Highway 1
  Montana Highway 38

Adjacent counties

 Missoula County - north
 Powell County - east
 Deer Lodge County - south
 Ravalli County - west

National protected areas
 Deerlodge National Forest (part)
 Lolo National Forest (part)

Politics

Demographics

2000 census
As of the 2000 United States census, there were 2,830 people, 1,200 households, and 784 families living in the county. The population density was 2 people per square mile (1/km2). There were 2,074 housing units at an average density of 1 per square mile (0/km2).  The racial makeup of the county was 96.25% White, 1.27% Native American, 0.14% Asian, 0.04% Pacific Islander, 0.46% from other races, and 1.84% from two or more races. 1.27% of the population were Hispanic or Latino of any race. 17.8% were of German, 13.5% English, 13.1% Irish, 8.3% American and 7.2% Norwegian ancestry.

There were 1,200 households, out of which 27.10% had children under the age of 18 living with them, 54.70% were married couples living together, 7.40% had a female householder with no husband present, and 34.60% were non-families. 30.10% of all households were made up of individuals, and 12.30% had someone living alone who was 65 years of age or older.  The average household size was 2.33 and the average family size was 2.91.

The county population contained 24.20% under the age of 18, 5.70% from 18 to 24, 23.30% from 25 to 44, 30.80% from 45 to 64, and 15.90% who were 65 years of age or older. The median age was 43 years. For every 100 females there were 105.10 males. For every 100 females age 18 and over, there were 102.60 males.

The median income for a household in the county was $27,813, and the median income for a family was $33,485. Males had a median income of $26,250 versus $17,961 for females. The per capita income for the county was $16,636. About 13.90% of families and 16.80% of the population were below the poverty line, including 24.20% of those under age 18 and 8.50% of those age 65 or over.

2010 census
As of the 2010 United States census, there were 3,079 people, 1,417 households, and 911 families living in the county. The racial makeup of the county was 97.5% white, 0.4% American Indian, 0.1% black or African American, 0.1% Asian, 0.2% from other races, and 1.7% from two or more races. Those of Hispanic or Latino origin made up 1.4% of the population. In terms of ancestry, 26.2% were German, 20.2% were Irish, 18.8% were English, 13.5% were Norwegian, and 7.9% were American.

Of the 1,417 households, 19.6% had children under the age of 18 living with them, 55.3% were married couples living together, 5.7% had a female householder with no husband present, 35.7% were non-families, and 29.5% of all households were made up of individuals. The average household size was 2.14 and the average family size was 2.63. The median age was 52.1 years.

The median income for a household in the county was $36,052 and the median income for a family was $47,685. Males had a median income of $41,307 versus $23,958 for females. The per capita income for the county was $23,222. About 7.5% of families and 12.1% of the population were below the poverty line, including 5.4% of those under age 18 and 13.3% of those age 65 or over.

Communities

Towns

 Drummond
 Philipsburg (county seat)

Census-designated places

 Maxville
 Hall

Unincorporated communities

 Beartown
 New Chicago
 Quigley
 Princeton
 Sherryl
 Stone

Ghost Towns

 Bearmouth
 Garnet
 Granite
 Nimrod

See also
 List of lakes in Granite County, Montana
 List of mountains in Granite County, Montana
 National Register of Historic Places listings in Granite County, Montana

References

Further reading
 Loen, J.S., M.J. Blaskowski, and J.E. Elliott. (1989). Geology and mineral deposits of the Miners Gulch Area, Granite County, Montana [U.S. Geological Survey Bulletin 1791]. Washington, D.C.: U.S. Department of the Interior, U.S. Geological Survey.

 
1893 establishments in Montana
Populated places established in 1893